This is the discography for the American jazz singer Randy Crawford.

Albums

Studio albums

 Album was released as Permanent in North America and as Play Mode in the rest of the world.

Live albums

Compilation albums

Singles

  Crawford sang uncredited lead vocals on "Street Life".

Guest appearances 
 Big Man: The Legend of John Henry (1975) by Cannonball Adderley (recording debut)
 Please Don't Touch (1978) by Steve Hackett (One track: "Hoping Love Will Last")
 Zucchero Live at the Kremlin (1991) by Zucchero (Two tracks: "Come Il Sole All'improvviso" and "Imagine")
 Hard to Hold (1984) by Rick Springfield (One track: "Taxi Dancing")
 La Noche (1995) by Presuntos Implicados (One track: "Fallen")

References 

Discographies of American artists
Jazz discographies